Credit Libanais (Arabic: بنك الاعتماد اللبناني) is a Lebanese bank, established in 1961. Having originated with one branch in Riad El Solh Square, today the Bank is headquartered in Adlieh and has a wide network of branches in Lebanon, Cyprus, Bahrain, and  Senegal. Credit Libanais operates as a global provider of a full range of banking products and services channeled through an extensive network of local branches and provides its customers alongside key classical banking activities, Islamic banking, insurance, leasing, real estate, tourism and ticketing, debt collection services, information technology, and advertising.

History 
Credit Libanais SAL was established in 1961 as a Lebanese joint stock company. In 1996, the Bank issued the first Euro CDs listed on foreign stock markets. In 2005, Credit Libanais launched its Islamic banking operations through its subsidiary, the Lebanese Islamic Bank .

Acquisitions 
Throughout its history, Credit Libanais acquired many banks in Lebanon such as Continental Bank in 1977, First Phoenician Bank and Capital Trust Bank in 1994, and the operations of American Express Bank in Lebanon in 2000.

Awards 
National and International Stakeholders’ Awards to Credit Libanais include:

 The Prestigious Visa International “Lifetime Achievement Award” to Chairman Dr. Joseph Torbey (2019). 

 The Golden Decoration “Arab Banker of the Year” to Chairman Dr. Joseph Torbey by the Union of Arab Banks in Rome (June 2019)

 Union of Arab Banks recognizes Credit Libanais with the Reconstruction and Development Award. (2017)

 World Union of Arab Bankers  grants Credit Libanais the Safest Bank Award.(2017, 2018)

 The Middle East Security Awards Conference grants Credit Libanais the CISO (Chief Information Security Officer) 100 Award (2016, 2017, 2018).

 Cross Knowledge E-learning Iquad Solutions recognizes Credit Libanais with the Best E-learning Roll-out Academy Award (2014).
 The Social Economic Award grants Credit Libanais the National and Social Impact Award (2014), and the Housing loans Category Award for financing stability in the lives of Lebanese families (2012).
 Peak of Success Award, the World Confederation of Businesses (2013-2009).

Correspondent Banks Awards to Credit Libanais 

 Citibank recognizes Credit Libanais with the STP Excellence Award (2016-2015-2014).
JP Morgan recognizes Credit Libanais with the STP Excellence Award (2017-2015-2013). 
Standard Chartered recognizes Credit Libanais the STP USD Clearing Excellence Award (2014-2013).

 Deutsche Bank recognizes Credit Libanais with the Euro STP Excellence Award (2017-2014).

Subsidiaries 

CLA
 Collect SAL
 Credilease
 Credit Card Management
Lebanese Islamic Bank
 Net Commerce
 Soft Management
 Hermes Tourism & Travel
 IPN Participant Banks

References

Banks of Lebanon